Yawarlukru or Yawar Lukru (Kichwa yawar blood, lukru soup, "blood soup", hispanicized spellings Yahuarlocro, Yahuar Locro) is a traditional dish of Ecuadorian cuisine. Is a light stew prepared with meat and entrails of lamb including brain, intestines, liver, lung, tongue, rumen, etc. It's usually served with fried lamb blood, avocado and pickled red onion rings.

It can be consumed as a snack or as a main dish depending on the size of the plate. It's consumed in the Ecuadorian Andes range and is considered a representative dish of Ecuadorian cuisine.

Recipe
Boil the meat parts with onions (red or Spanish onion), two garlic heads and some spring onions, until the meat is soft, separate and keep the stock in a bowl.

Chop the intestines and other meats in cubes; fry garlic and onions with a dash of oregano in oil or lard, add achiote (annatto paste) and when these garnitures are fully fried add the intestines, rumen cubes and potatoes; and water; boil until potatoes are ready. Add some more potatoes, milk, salt, pepper and finely chopped coriander.

In a separate frying pan over fry in oil the onion rings, spring onions, garlic and oregano; when ready add the clogged lamb or chicken blood.

Serve hot after mixing both the fried parts and the stock in a single pot. As a side dish some more fried blood, pickled onion rings, fine chopped coriander, ripe (soft) avocado and tomato slices can be served.

References 

Cuisine
Latin American cuisine
South American cuisine